Elsa Elvira Carlsson, Elsa Elvira Karlsson (13 February 1892 – 13 October 1978) was a Swedish stage and film actress.

Partial filmography

 Nortullsligan (1923) - Girl in sewing circle
 Modern Wives (1932) - Ebba Tallén
 Pettersson & Bendel (1933) -  Agda Alvin
 Simon of Backabo (1934) - Mademoiselle Claire de la Meunière (uncredited)
 The Marriage Game (1935) - Polly, hennes väninna
 Conscientious Objector Adolf (1936) - Aunt Maria
 Adventure (1936) - Countess Lagercrona
 65, 66 and I (1936) - Lisa Pettersson
 The Andersson Family (1937) - Maria Andersson
 Rosor varje kväll (1939) - Mrs. Hyltén
 Oh, What a Boy! (1939) - Mrs. Blomberg
 The Crazy Family (1940) - Fru Laura Blom
 Hanna in Society (1940) - Lucie Hummerberg
 Älskling, jag ger mig (1943) - Annie Carleman
 How to Love (1947) - Ebba Lindgren von Hacken
 The Bride Came Through the Ceiling (1947) - Augustine Lejoncrona
 Banketten (1948) - Agnes
 Fiancée for Hire (1950) - Mrs. Winkler
 The Nuthouse (1951) - Adolf's aunt
 Getting Married (1955) - Emilia
 Egen ingång (1956) - Mrs. Petreus
 Mother Takes a Vacation (1957) - Elisabeth Broms
 Fröken Chic (1959) - Margit van Boren
 The Wedding Day (1960) - Victoria Blom
 Tre önskningar (1960) - Mrs. Anglin
 Do You Believe in Angels? (1961) - The Aunt

References

Bibliography 
Lars Lofgren. Svensk teater. Natur & Kultur, 2003.

Further reading

External links 

People from Gothenburg
1892 births
1978 deaths
Swedish film actresses
Swedish silent film actresses
20th-century Swedish actresses